Mirage is an album by American flugelhornist Art Farmer's Quintet featuring performances recorded in 1982 and released on the Soul Note label.

Reception
The Allmusic review stated "Mirage marked a reunion for Art Farmer and Clifford Jordan, who had known each other for decades but only recorded together on occasion at the time of these 1982 sessions".

Track listing
 "Barbados" (Charlie Parker) - 5:07     
 "Passos" (Fritz Pauer) - 7:13     
 "My Kinda Love" (Louis Alter, Jo Trent) - 8:24     
 "Mirage" (Fred Hersch) - 8:12     
 "Cherokee Sketches" (Pauer) - 6:38     
 "Smiling Billy" (Jimmy Heath) - 5:54

Personnel
Art Farmer - flugelhorn
Clifford Jordan - tenor saxophone
Fred Hersch - piano
Ray Drummond - bass
Akira Tana - drums

References 

Black Saint/Soul Note albums
Art Farmer albums
1982 albums